Endogenous substances and processes are those that originate from within a living system such as an organism, tissue, or cell.

In contrast, exogenous substances and processes are those that originate from outside of an organism.

For example, estradiol is an endogenous estrogen hormone produced within the body, whereas ethinylestradiol is an exogenous synthetic estrogen, commonly used in birth control pills.

References

External links

Biology